Spirit of Jefferson is an independent, weekly newspaper covering Charles Town and Jefferson County, West Virginia. Originally two separate papers, "The Spirit of Jefferson", first published in 1844, and "The Farmer's Advocate", first published in 1890. were both sold to Ralph Dorsey in 1935. In 1948, the two papers were merged. It is the longest-running newspaper in West Virginia.

External links
 Spirit of Jefferson Website

References

Newspapers published in West Virginia
Jefferson County, West Virginia
Publications established in 1948
1948 establishments in West Virginia
1844 establishments in Virginia
Newspapers published in Virginia
Publications established in 1844
Charles Town, West Virginia